Elections for North West Leicestershire District Council took place on 3 May 2007, with the previous election taking place in 2003 and with the next to be held on 5 May 2011. The election took place across all 20 electoral wards and a total of 38 councillors were elected. This election was a landslide win for the Conservatives who gained an absolute majority in the council for the first time since its creation in 1973.

Results

|}

Ward results
In wards that are represented by more than one councillor, electors were given more than one vote each, hence the voter turnout may not match the number of votes cast.

References

2007
2007 English local elections
2000s in Leicestershire